Kenny "Kong" McFarlane (also known as King Kong) is a fictional character appearing in American comic books published by Marvel Comics. Created by Brian Michael Bendis and Mark Bagley, the character appears in the pages of Ultimate Spider-Man. Kenny McFarlane is one of the few characters not based on a counterpart from Marvel's main continuity, being an original Ultimate Marvel invention to the comics. However, his personality is based on Flash Thompson of the main continuity during his high school years. A version of the character is later introduced in the main continuity. 

In Ultimate Spider-Man, despite his apparent lack of intelligence based on being a stereotypical high school bully, Kenny is actually a perceptive teenager and able to deduce Spider-Man's secret identity but keeps this knowledge to himself; he respects the hero's wishes of secrecy and covertly helps him maintaining it. Knowing that Peter Parker is Spider-Man inspires Kenny to be a better person and occasionally helping others in needs.

Fictional character biography
Obese yet strong, Kenny McFarlane is the best friend of Flash Thompson and Liz Allan. Kenny attends Midtown High School where he plays basketball for the school team. There, he can regularly be found cooperating with Flash bullying Peter Parker. However, without Flash in the vicinity, he shows a more likeable side and is often shown being friendly and open to Peter, even letting Peter stay at his house after Peter had a fight with Uncle Ben. When Peter is bitten by the genetically enhanced spider that gave the spider powers, Kenny crushes the spider under his sneakers, killing it. Later, noticing changes in Peter's physical strength and abilities and recalling the spider bite, he deduces that Peter is Spider-Man. Flash and Liz refuse to believe him and demand he prove it by kicking Peter from behind. Peter's spider sense warns that the kick is coming and he willingly takes the abuse rather than reveal himself, which appears to dissuade Kenny. This confrontation is observed by the new student Gwen Stacy sticking up for Peter by pulling a knife on Kong.

Kong's attitude toward's Peter softens after the latter joins the basketball team and demonstrates deep loyalty to his new teammate. Kong maintains a fascination with Spider-Man even to the point of hero worship. Overtime, Kenny becomes a better person, ceased bullying, and tries to improve academically. Upon hearing about the upcoming Spider-Man movie, Kong enters a casting call for extras. His only line was "Look in the sky, it's Spider-Man!". With the film's success, he achieved some fame in his school.

When Kenny and Peter share detention, Peter tells Kenny that Flash only hangs out with the latter solely out of a sense of superiority and treats him badly. Whether or not Kenny takes Peter's words to heart, he later has a particularly violent confrontation with Flash after the latter begins ridiculing the new student Kitty Pryde for being a mutant; Kenny slams Flash into a locker and furiously forces his friend to apologize, claiming he is "sick of [Flash's] racist crap", ending their friendship in the process. Frightened, Flash leaves the scene and Peter and MJ introduce Kitty to Kenny, and the pair walk away in conversation. He is later seen at Kitty's house, and Kitty later tells Peter of dating Kenny.

Later, when Liz's mutant abilities manifest at a party, Kenny tells Peter to go help her; he still knew that Peter was Spider-Man all along but had kept the knowledge to himself. When Kitty was singled out by federal troops for being a mutant after the events of Ultimatum, Kenny was one of the few classmates to stick up for Kitty, physically assaulting an agent to buy her time to escape. Kitty phased herself and Kenny through the floor and into the sewers, and they resume their relationship. Later, Kitty tells Peter that Kenny's mother took him out of the state.

Kong later shows up at an event hosted by May Parker to honor Peter and has a private conversation with Kitty.

Following the Secret Wars events that seemingly destroyed Kenny's universe, he is revealed to have joined the U.S. army after finishing high school in the restored world.

Other versions

Marvel Universe
Kenneth "Kenny Kong" McFarlane made his debut in the mainstream Marvel Universe in Starbrand & Nightmask #1 (February 2016). He is a student at Empire State University and meets Kevin Connor and Adam Blackveil. He discovers that they are actually Starbrand and Nightmask, but he keeps this information to himself.

Character's name
Writer Brian Michael Bendis did not name Kenny McFarlane consistently during his run on Ultimate Spider-Man. In the first scenes, he is called by his nickname King Kong or simply Kong or even his real name. His last name was hinted to be Harlan in the first issue and his mother called him Clifford in issue #15. While in Ultimate Marvel Team-Up around the same time, in a story also written by Brian Michael Bendis, a teacher calls him Kenny. As a result of this information, in the "Official Handbook of the Ultimate Marvel Universe", he was referred to as "Kong Harlan, aka Clifford Kenneth Harlan". However, in issue Ultimate Spider-Man #82, his name is finally revealed to be "Kenny McFarlane". He now refers to himself as Kenny McFarlane, and in an interview with Bendis, it is confirmed that this is his real name.

In other media

Television

 Kenny McFarlane appears in The Spectacular Spider-Man, voiced by Andrew Kishino. This version (where his name is changed to Kenny Kong) is more fat than muscular, and his ethnic background is changed to Samoan/Chinese American. He is on the Midtown High football team with Flash Thompson and Randy Robertson. There, he is the former's closest friend on the team and can regularly be found cooperating with him bullying Peter Parker and other lesser students. He dated Glory Grant until Glory broke up with him for being too childish. Glory later forgives him and they get back together though Glory does still get annoyed by his childishness.

Video games
 Kenny McFarlane has a cameo appearance in the Ultimate Spider-Man video game. His character can be seen in the models section of the special features.

References

Fictional characters from parallel universes
Fictional characters from New York City
Ultimate Marvel characters
Comics characters introduced in 2001
Characters created by Brian Michael Bendis
Characters created by Mark Bagley
Fictional actors
Fictional basketball players
Fictional bullies
Fictional United States Army personnel
Male characters in comics
Spider-Man characters